[[File: 紫萁 20190526173645.jpg|thumb|right|upright|Young plant ]]Osmunda is a genus of primarily temperate-zone ferns of family Osmundaceae. Five to ten species have been listed for this genus.

Description
Completely dimorphic fronds or pinnae (hemidimorphic), green photosynthetic sterile fronds, and non-photosynthetic spore-bearing fertile pinnae, with large, naked sporangia. Because of the large mass of sporangia that ripen uniformly at the same time to a showy golden color, the ferns look as if they are in flower, and so this genus is sometimes called the "flowering ferns".

TaxonomyOsmunda, the type genus of the fern order, Osmundales has historically been the largest genus in the family Osmundaceae. Smith et al. (2006), who carried out the first higher-level pteridophyte classification published in the molecular phylogenetic era, described three genera in that family, namely Osmunda, Leptopteris, and Todea. The genus has also been treated historically as consisting of a number of subgroups, generally subgenera, Osmunda (3 species), Osmundastrum (2 species), and Plenasium (3–4 species). However, there was suspicion that the genus was not monophyletic.

The publication of a detailed phylogeny of the family by Metzgar et al. in 2008 showed that Osmunda as circumscribed was paraphyletic and that Osmunda cinnamomea, despite its morphological similarity to Osmunda claytoniana, was sister to the rest of the family, and resurrected the segregate genus Osmundastrum, by elevating it from subgenus, to contain it and render Osmunda monophyletic. The phylogeny of Osmunda is shown in the following cladograms.

A number of authors have proposed elevating the subgenera to separate genus level, In 2016 the Pteridophyte Phylogeny Group (PPG) classification split Osmunda further by elevating its subgenera to genera as Claytosmunda and Plenasium, leaving only the species originally included in subgenus Osmunda.O. abyssinica (Kuhn 1879) BobrovO. acuta (Burm.fil. 1768) Fraser-Jenk.O. chengii Bomfleur, Grimm & McLoughlin [Osmunda claytoniites Phipps, Taylor & Taylor non Graham 1963]O. herbacea CopelandO. hybrida Tsutsumi et al.O. × intermedia {O. lancea × O. japonica}O. japonica Thunberg (Japanese flowering fern)O. lancea Thunberg (Japanese lancea flowering fern)O. x mildei {O. angustifolia × O. japonica}O. piresii Brade 1965O. regalis L. (Old World royal fern)O. × ruggii {O. claytoniana × O. spectabilis}O. spectabilis Willdenow (American royal fern)O. wehrii Miller (Middle Miocene, Washington state)

Etymology
The derivation of the genus name is uncertain. A leading theory is that it is from an English folk tale of a boatman named Osmund hiding his wife and children in a patch of royal fern during the Danish invasion. Other theories propose that it is from Middle English and Middle French words for a type of fern.

EcologyOsmunda species are used as food plants by the larvae of some Lepidoptera species including the engrailed.

One of the species, the cinnamon fern (Osmundastrum cinnamomeum) forms huge clonal colonies in swamp areas. These ferns form massive rootstocks with densely matted, wiry roots. This root mass is an excellent substrate for many epiphytal plants. They are often harvested as osmundine and used horticulturally, especially in propagating and growing orchids.

References

Bibliography

 
 
 
 
 
 
 
 
 
 
 
 , in 
 Phipps, C.J., Taylor, T.N., Taylor, E.L., Cuneo, N.R., Boucher, L.D., and Yao, X. (1998). Osmunda'' (Osmundaceae) from the Triassic of Antarctica: An example of evolutionary stasis. American Journal of Botany 85: 888-895

External links

Germplasm Resources Information Network: Osmunda
Flora of North America: Osmunda
Species list for Osmunda
http://data.gbif.org/species/browse/taxon/13191108

Osmundales
Extant Triassic first appearances
Fern genera
Taxa named by Carl Linnaeus